The president of the People's Republic of China was created in 1954 when the first constitution consolidated the system of government in the People's Republic of China. At the time, the title was translated into English as State Chairman. The position was abolished between 1975 and 1982 with the functions of head of state being performed by the chairman of the Standing Committee of the National People's Congress (head of legislature). The presidency was revived under the fourth constitution in 1982.

List of heads of state 
 Generations of leadership

Central People's Government (1949–1954) 
Chairman of the Central People's Government

The 1st Constitution (1954–1975)
Chairman of the People's Republic of China

The 2nd and 3rd Constitutions (1975–1982) 

 Chairman of the Standing Committee of the National People's Congress

 Honorary Chairwoman of the People's Republic of China

The 4th Constitution (1983–present)
President of the People's Republic of China

Timeline

References

See also 

List of Chinese leaders
Leader of the Chinese Communist Party
Orders of precedence in the People's Republic of China
 Vice President of the People's Republic of China
 List of premiers of the People's Republic of China
 List of vice premiers of the People's Republic of China
 Paramount leader - a informal list of those who have been considered the highest leader of the party and the People's Republic of China
 Orders of precedence in China

Presidents
China, People's Republic of
.L
.L
Lists of leaders of China
Lists of Chinese people